Willis Charles “Billy” Edson (September 25, 1874 in Wilton, Illinois – March 5, 1965) was a football player, lawyer, and politician in Iowa.  He was a halfback on the University of Iowa’s Big Ten championship team in 1900 and was the Speaker of the Iowa House of Representatives from 1925-1926.

Playing career

Billy Edson learned football while attending Buena Vista College from 1894-1896.  He transferred to Iowa State University, where he played two seasons on the football team and earned his bachelor's degree.  Edson attended law school at the University of Iowa, earning his law degree in 1901.

Edson starred on two undefeated Hawkeye teams in 1899 and 1900.  As a junior in 1899, he helped Iowa to an 8-0-1 record, with the tie being a 5-5 draw against Amos Alonzo Stagg's University of Chicago team.    Edson scored the game's only touchdown in the contest against Chicago.  In the final game of the season, he scored five touchdowns for Iowa in a 58-0 victory over Illinois.  At the end of the season, Iowa was admitted into the Big Ten Conference, beginning in 1900.

As a senior in 1900, Edson helped lead Iowa to a Big Ten championship in its first year in the conference.  He scored one touchdown in Iowa's first ever Big Ten game, a 17-0 victory over Chicago, and he scored another touchdown the following week in a 28-5 victory over Michigan.  In two years at Iowa, Edson scored 23 touchdowns, including seven of fifty yards or more.

Legal and political career

After obtaining his law degree in 1901, Billy Edson spent one season as an assistant football coach at the University of Northern Iowa before beginning a long and successful legal and political career.  He practiced law in Storm Lake, Iowa, for over sixty years and was a member of the Iowa State Legislature from 1919-1927.    Edson served as the Speaker of the Iowa House of Representatives from 1925-1926 and was the Republican candidate for Lieutenant Governor of Iowa in 1936.

Honors

Edson served for decades on the Board of Trustees at Buena Vista College.  For his long-standing support of the college, Buena Vista renamed their gymnasium, Victory Hall, in his honor.  Edson Hall is now used by Buena Vista's music department.  For his athletic career, Billy Edson was inducted into the Iowa Sports Hall of Fame in 1959.

References

1874 births
1965 deaths
Iowa Hawkeyes football players
People from Will County, Illinois
People from Storm Lake, Iowa